The following lists events that happened during 2015 in the Republic of Albania.

Incumbents
President: Bujar Nishani
Prime Minister: Edi Rama
Deputy Prime Minister: Niko Peleshi

Events
March - Socialist government announces plan to privatise state oil company Albpetrol, two years after previous Democratic Party government shelved it.

Deaths
 14 March - Petro Zheji, scientist, philosopher and translator

See also
 2015 in Albanian television

References

 
2010s in Albania
Years of the 21st century in Albania
Albania
Albania